The 1998 Recopa Sudamericana was the tenth Recopa Sudamericana, an annual football match between the winners of the previous season's Copa Libertadores and Supercopa Sudamericana competitions. This will become the last Recopa Sudamericana on this format as the Supercopa Sudamericana was discontinued by CONMEBOL in 1998. With no existing secondary tournament, the Recopa Sudamericana became an impracticable competition until the introduction of the Copa Sudamericana in 2002.

The series was contested between Cruzeiro, winners of the 1997 Copa Libertadores, and River Plate, winners of the 1997 Supercopa Sudamericana, in a two-legged series. Due to schedule congestion, this edition was played as part of the 1999 Copa Mercosur (one of the two tournaments that replaced the Supercopa Sudamericana) two years after the participating clubs won their respective qualifying tournaments (instead of the regular 6–12 months). Further devaluing this year's Recopa, River Plate sent a reserved squad on the first leg losing 2-0. On the return leg, Cruzeiro thrashed River Plate 3–0 and won their first Recopa Sudamericana (after failing to do so in 1992 and 1993).

After the home defeat, the Argentines turned off the stadium lights, turned on the lawn irrigation system and only allowed the delivery of the trophy in the locker room, preventing a "victory lap". This disgraceful act prompted CONMEBOL into revising their awarding ceremonies.

Qualified teams

Venues

Match details

First leg

Second leg

References

Rec
Recopa Sudamericana
Recopa Sudamericana 1998
Recopa Sudamericana 1998
Football in Buenos Aires